Jan-Erik "Rit-Ola" Garland (1905–1988) was a Swedish cartoonist, journalist and comic creator. Formerly an athlete, Garland later started to draw editorial cartoons and sports caricatures for several Swedish newspapers. In 1936, he created the comic Biffen och Bananen for the magazine Folket i Bild.

He was born in Stockholm, a son of politician Olof Olsson and Gabriella Hainer, and married Nanny Åström in 1936.

References

External links
Rit-Ola info from the Lambiek Comiclopedia of Artists

Swedish bandy players
Swedish comics artists
Swedish editorial cartoonists
Swedish illustrators
1905 births
1988 deaths
AIK Bandy players
20th-century Swedish journalists